Rafael Antonio Caroca Cordero (born 19 July 1989) is a Chilean professional footballer who plays as a midfielder for Chilean Primera División club Ñublense.

Club career
Born in Curicó, Maule Region, Caroca arrived in Colo-Colo's youth academy aged 14, after being discovered in 2004 by Marcelo Espina, club's legend. Three years later, already on mid-2007, he was promoted to the first-adult team and appeared in the bench some Torneo Clausura games.

For the 2008 he was loaned to O'Higgins to gain experience. However, he returned to Macul–based team the following year and was part of the champion team that reached the Torneo Clausura. In January 2010, Caroca was loaned to Deportes La Serena and stayed there until December 2011 where was an immovable player during his spell.

Since 2013 he plays for Deportes Iquique, being on loan during 2013-14 season (where he won the Copa Chile) and then definitely joining the incoming season.

International career
In January 2008, Marcelo Bielsa called up Caroca to the Chile national team for friendlies that were played on the home turf of Japan and South Korea.  He was also called up for the March 2008 friendly against Israel in Jerusalem; Caroca was the only player from the domestic league to be named in the squad.

In May 2008, Caroca was once again selected by Bielsa.  This time it was to the u-23 2008 Toulon Tournament.  Caroca started the last three games Chile played in the tournament.  Caroca was one of the youngest players to see significant playing time during the tournament.  Caroca was named the best young player of the tournament. In addition, he took part in both the 2009 and the 2010 editions.

Nine years later, he was called up by Argentine coach Juan Antonio Pizzi to Chilean senior team for play the 2017 China Cup. He played one game against Croatia in the friendly tournament that Chile won.

Personal life
It was said his mother is Venezuelan, but he denied it, rejecting a possible call-up to the Venezuela senior team. He has two younger brothers who are professional footballers: Ignacio – who has been international with Chile at U20 level – and Matías.

Honours

Club
Colo-Colo
 Primera División de Chile (2): 2007 Clausura, 2009 Clausura

Deportes Iquique
 Copa Chile: 2013–14

International
 Toulon Tournament: 2009
 China Cup: 2017

References

External links
 
 

1989 births
Living people
People from Curicó
Chilean footballers
Chile international footballers
Chile under-20 international footballers
Colo-Colo footballers
O'Higgins F.C. footballers
Deportes La Serena footballers
Colo-Colo B footballers
Deportes Iquique footballers
Universidad de Chile footballers
Ñublense footballers
Chilean Primera División players
Segunda División Profesional de Chile players
Association football midfielders